Paramita Rajya Laxmi Rana (born October 2, 1993 in Lalitpur, Nepal), known professionally as Paramita RL Rana or simply Paramita Rana, is a Nepalese film actress, model, singer, influencer. She rose into fame following her debut role in the film Chapali Height 2 opposite Ayushman Joshi.

Controversy 
In December 2019, Rana was a passenger in a car that struck and killed a woman. The driver of the car, Prithvi Malla, was drunk at the time and was subsequently charged with vehicular homicide. Rana's actions in the aftermath of the accident were heavily criticized for being insensitive as she escaped from the crime scene and did not admit to being involved until weeks later.

Filmography

References

External links 
 

Living people
Nepalese businesspeople
Nepalese singer-songwriters
Nepalese female models
21st-century Nepalese women singers
1993 births
People from Lalitpur District, Nepal
Nepalese film actresses
Actresses in Nepali cinema
21st-century Nepalese actresses